Jeremie or Jérémie may refer to:
 Jérémie, a commune in Haiti
 Jeremie (name), given name and surname, includes a list of people with the name
 Jérémie (given name), includes a list of people with the name

See also 
 Jeremy (disambiguation)